Kerala Sastra Sahitya Parishad (KSSP) (meaning: Kerala Science Literature Movement) is a project in the state of Kerala, India.

It was conceived as a people's science movement. When it was founded in 1962, it was a 40-member group consisting of science writers and teachers, with an interest in science from a social perspective. Its membership has grown to about 60,000, in about 2,300 units spread over Kerala. In 1996, the group received the Right Livelihood Award "for its major contribution to a model of development rooted in social justice and popular participation."

Introduction
The original objective of KSSP was limited to publishing scientific literature in Malayalam, the local language, and popularizing science. However it was soon realized that publication and giving lessons were not enough to popularize science. KSSP chose as its mission giving people the tools of science and technology. Thus in 1974, KSSP decided to become a people's science movement and adopted "science for social revolution" as its motto.
It has grown into a people's science movement with a membership of about 60,000 and distributed in about 2,300 units within the state of Kerala. KSSP is involved, broadly in three types of activities: education, agitatative (sic), and constructive(sic), in areas like environment, health, education, energy, literacy, micro planning and development in general.

B Ramesh is the president and Joji Koottummel the general secretary. Intellectuals and activists such as M. K. Prasad, R. V. G. Menon, Kavumbayi Balakrishnan, B. Ekbal,K K Krishnakumar, Prof K R Janardanan, R Radhakrishnan, K. Pappooty, M. P. Parameswaran, Kunhikkannan TP, T Radhamani,  Dr K N Ganesh, Dr K P Aravindan, T Gangandharan have been past presidents of the organization.

History
On September 10, 1962, Kozhikode Devagiri College, Principal Fr.  Theodosius inaugurated the Kerala Sasthra Sahithya Parishad. K. Bhaskaran Nair was the first president.

Publications 

KSSP publishes two monthly magazines, Sastrakeralam for secondary school students and Sastragathi, and a biweekly, Eureka (for primary school students) and a newsletter Parishad Vartha. Eureka and Sastrakeralam are intended for children and the newsletter for members. Sastragathi is the organization's main magazine. KSSP's major contribution is publishing science books in Malayalam with about 700 titles published. One of the books published is  Jeevarekha  by Dr. M. P. Parameswaran. KSSP has published hundreds of small booklets, related to different issues. LUCA is the online science portal of KSSP.

Research

Kerala Padanam 
In 2004, KSSP conducted a survey of the living conditions in Kerala. The survey was titled Kerala Padanam-Keralam engane jeevikkunnu Keralam Engane Chinthikkunnu, translated as The Kerala Study-How Does Kerala Live? How Does Kerala Think?. It covered about 6000 households in the state. The activists spent time with each family to understand their lifestyle and thoughts. The population of Kerala has been divided into four classes or groups. Around 40% of the people are very poor, and only a minority of about 10% of the people belong to the upper middle class and control their state of affairs. The findings were published in a book with the same title as the survey Kerala Padanam-Keralam engane jeevikkunnu Keralam Engane Chinthikkunnu.

Products
KSSP has developed self-reliant products and marketed them though its units and the local offices of the Parishad Production Centre and the Samata Production Center which are attached to district KSSP offices.

Hot box
Hot box is an energy efficient therrmocol box which keeps the temperature constant, saving energy and fuel. It is used for rice cooking and keeping normal food items hot. When rice is cooked normally, the fire is maintained until it is cooked. If the water temperature can be maintained at  without further heating, fuel is saved. This is what the Hot Box is designed to do. Rice is cooked in water until it has boiled and the bowl is put in the Hotbox until it is fully cooked.

Portable Biogas Plant
IRTC, the research wing of KSSP has launched another product , the Portable biogas plant. This helps with the proper disposal of waste and conserves energy.

References

External links 

 
 
 Kerala Padanam Website
1962 establishments in Kerala
Education in Kerala
Educational institutions established in 1962
Educational organisations based in India
Environmental organisations based in India
Indic literature societies
Non-profit organisations based in India
Organisations based in Kozhikode
Science and technology in Kerala
Scientific organisations based in India
Social movements in India